The 22867 / 22868 Durg - Hazrat Nizamuddin Humsafar Express is a superfast express train of the Indian Railways connecting  in Chhattisgarh and  in Delhi. It is currently being operated with 22867/22868 train numbers on bi-weekly basis.

Coach Composition 

The train is completely 3-tier AC sleeper designed by Indian Railways with features of LED screen display to show information about stations, train speed etc. and will have announcement system as well, Vending machines for tea, coffee and milk, Bio toilets in compartments as well as CCTV cameras.

Service

It averages 60 km/hr as 22867 Humsafar Express starts on Tuesday and Friday from  covering 1280 km in 21 hrs 20 mins & 58 km/hr as 22868 Humsafar Express starts on Wednesday and Saturday from  covering 1280 kilometer in 22 hours.

Traction

Both trains are hauled by a WAP 7 locomotive of Bhilai Electric Locomotive Shed on its entire journey.

Route & Halts 

 
 
 Bhatapara 
 
 
 Anuppur
 Shahdol
 Umaria

See also
Humsafar Express

References
http://indiarailinfo.com/train/durg-hazrat-nizamuddin-humsafar-express-22867/51998/187/748
http://indiarailinfo.com/train/hazrat-nizamuddin-durg-humsafar-express-22868/51997/748/187

Humsafar Express trains
Transport in Delhi
Transport in Durg
Rail transport in Chhattisgarh
Rail transport in Madhya Pradesh
Rail transport in Uttar Pradesh
Rail transport in Delhi
Railway services introduced in 2017